The 2020–21 Coppa Titano was the sixty-third edition of the football competition in San Marino. The cup started on 29 September 2020 and ended on 15 May 2021. The cup champions earned a place in the first season of the new 2021–22 UEFA Europa Conference League.

The previous edition of the cup was abandoned with no champion due to the COVID-19 pandemic in San Marino.

After a delay due to the COVID-19 pandemic, the cup resumed play on 10 March 2021 with a change in format from two-leg to one-leg rounds.

First round
The first legs of the first round were played from 29 September to 1 October 2020 and the second legs were played on 20–21 October 2020. The draw for the first round was held on 1 September 2020. Tre Penne received a bye in the first round.

|}

Quarter–finals
The quarter–finals were played on 10 March 2021.

|}

Semi–finals
The semi–finals were played on 28–29 April 2021.

|}

Final
The final was played on 15 May 2021.

See also
 2020–21 Campionato Sammarinese di Calcio

External links
 official site (Italian)
 uefa.com

References

Coppa Titano seasons
San Marino
Coppa Titano